Docks station or Dock station may refer to:

Barry Docks railway station, one of three railway stations serving the town of Barry, South Wales
Dagenham Dock railway station, on the London, Tilbury and Southend Railway line, serving areas in the London Borough of Barking and Dagenham, east London
Dockyard Devonport railway station
Falmouth Docks railway station, in Falmouth, Cornwall, England, the terminus of the Maritime Line to Truro, operated by Great Western Railway
Grimsby Docks railway station in Grimsby in North East Lincolnshire, England
Pontoon Dock DLR station, a station on the Docklands Light Railway (DLR) in Silvertown in east London
Surrey Docks tube station
Woolwich Dock railway station